Stanko Topolčnik (2 December 1947 – 14 April 2013) was a Slovenian judoka. He competed in the men's lightweight event at the 1972 Summer Olympics, representing Yugoslavia.

References

1947 births
2013 deaths
Slovenian male judoka
Olympic judoka of Yugoslavia
Judoka at the 1972 Summer Olympics
People from Slovenska Bistrica